The following highways are numbered 174:

Brazil
 BR-174

Canada
Ottawa Road 174
 Prince Edward Island Route 174

Costa Rica
 National Route 174

Ireland
 R174 road

Japan
 Route 174 (Japan) (Japan's shortest national highway)

United States
 Interstate 174 (proposed)
 Alabama State Route 174
 California State Route 174
 Connecticut Route 174
 Georgia State Route 174
 Illinois Route 174 (former)
 Kentucky Route 174
 Louisiana Highway 174
 Maine State Route 174
 Maryland Route 174
 M-174 (Michigan highway)
 Missouri Route 174
 New Jersey Route 174 (former)
 New Mexico State Road 174
 New York State Route 174
New York State Route 174X
 Ohio State Route 174
 Pennsylvania Route 174
 South Carolina Highway 174
 Tennessee State Route 174
 Texas State Highway 174
 Texas State Highway Spur 174
 Farm to Market Road 174
 Utah State Route 174
 Virginia State Route 174
 Washington State Route 174
 Wisconsin Highway 174  (former)
 Wyoming Highway 174
Territories:
 Puerto Rico Highway 174